Grand Mosque of Medan or Masjid Raya Al-Mashun is a mosque located in Medan, Indonesia. The mosque was built in the year 1906 and completed in 1909. In beginning of its establishment, the mosque was a part of the Maimun palace complex. Its architectural style combines Middle Eastern, Indian and Spanish elements. The mosque has an octagonal shape and has wings to the south, east, north and west.

History
Sultan Ma'mun Al Rashid Perkasa Alam as a leader of Sultanate of Deli started the development of Masjid Al Mashun on 21 August 1906 (1 Rajab 1324 AH). The entire development was completed on 10 September 1909 (25 Sha'ban 1329 AH) and marked by the implementation of the first Friday prayers at the mosque. The overall development budget was one million guilders. The Sultan developed the Mosque according to his principle that it should be more important than his own grand palace, the Maimoon Palace. Construction of the mosque was financed by the Sultanate of Deli, the Deli Maatschappij, and Tjong A Fie, the wealthiest businessman in Medan at that time.

Architecture
At first, the Mosque was designed by the Dutch architect Theodoor van Erp who also designed The Maimoon Palace, but was then handed over to JA Tingdeman. Van Erp at that time was called to Java by the Dutch government to join in the process of restoring the Borobudur temple in Central Java. The construction required the import of different building materials such as: marble from Italy, Germany and China and the stained glass from the chandelier imported from France.

JA Tingdeman designed the mosque with an octagonal symmetrical layout style, combining elements from Morocco, Europe and the Middle East. The eight square floor plan produced a unique inner chamber, unlike most conventional mosques. A black, high vaulted roof porch is constructed in each of the four corners of the mosque, and complements the main dome on the roof of the main building of the mosque. Each is equipped with a main door and stairs between the courts of the main floor of the mosque is elevated, except building the porch on the side of the mihrab.

The mosque is divided into the main room, ablution, entry gates and towers. The main room, a place of prayer, does not share the same octagonal theme. On the opposite side is smaller, there is a 'porch' small porch attached to and protrudes out. The windows surrounding the veranda doors made of wood with glass-precious stained glass, remnants of the art nouveau period 1890-1914, combined with Islamic art. The entire ornamentation in the mosque either in walls, ceilings, pillars, arches and rich surfaces with decorative flowers and plants. in front of each porch stairs there. Then, earlier octagon, on the outside appear with four aisles on all four sides, which surround the main prayer hall.

The aisles have a row of bare windows shaped arches which stand on the beam. Both porch and arched windows of the building design reminiscent of Islamic kingdoms in Spain in the Middle Ages. While the dome of the mosque following the Turkish model, the shape of the octagonal broken. The main dome surrounded by four other domes on top of each porch, with a smaller size. Dome shape is reminiscent of the Grand Mosque of Banda Aceh. On the inside of the mosque, there are eight main pillar diameter of 0.60 m tall to support the main dome in the middle. The mihrab is made of marble with a pointed dome roof. This mosque gate flat-roofed square. While the ornate minaret blend between Egyptian, Iranian and Arabian.

See also
List of colonial buildings in Medan

References

Further reading

External links

Sejarah Masjid Al Mahsun Medan 

Mosques completed in 1909
Mosques in Medan
Tourist attractions in North Sumatra
Medan